Marie ("Mieke") Jaapies (born 7 August 1943) is a Dutch sprint canoer. She competed at the 1968 and 1972 Summer Olympics in 500 m singles and 500 m doubles. She won a silver medal in the singles in 1972 and finished in 6th-8th place in other three events.

Jaapies also won two silver medals in the K-1 500 m event at the ICF Canoe Sprint World Championships, earning them in 1970 and 1971.

References

Dutch Olympic Committee profile 

1943 births
Living people
Dutch female canoeists
Canoeists at the 1968 Summer Olympics
Canoeists at the 1972 Summer Olympics
ICF Canoe Sprint World Championships medalists in kayak
Medalists at the 1972 Summer Olympics
Olympic canoeists of the Netherlands
Olympic medalists in canoeing
Olympic silver medalists for the Netherlands
Sportspeople from Zaanstad
20th-century Dutch women
21st-century Dutch women